Desert Patrol is a 1938 American Western film directed by Sam Newfield and written by Fred Myton. The film stars Bob Steele, Marion Weldon, Rex Lease, Ted Adams, Forrest Taylor and Budd Buster. The film was released on June 6, 1938, by Republic Pictures.

Plot

Cast 
Bob Steele as Dave Austin
Marion Weldon as Jean Drury
Rex Lease as Dan Drury
Ted Adams as Apache Joe
Forrest Taylor as Martin Rand
Budd Buster as Hezi Watts
Steve Clark as Captain
Jack Ingram as Chet
Julian Madison as Carson

References

External links
 

1938 films
1930s English-language films
American Western (genre) films
1938 Western (genre) films
Republic Pictures films
Films directed by Sam Newfield
Films set in deserts
American black-and-white films
1930s American films